Slaughter King is the second mixtape by Atlanta-based rapper 21 Savage. It was released on December 1, 2015.

Release and promotion
On December 2, 2015, the music video "Dirty K" was released. The mixtape was re-released on all streaming platforms on May 5, 2016 along with The Slaughter Tape and singles "Red Opps" and "One Foot".

Track listing

References

2015 mixtape albums
21 Savage albums